The 1911 Nova Scotia general election was held on 14 June 1911 to elect members of the 35th House of Assembly of the Province of Nova Scotia, Canada. It was won by the Liberal party.

Results

Results by party

Retiring incumbents
Liberal
Joseph A. Bancroft, Annapolis
Charles F. Cooper, Queens
Neil J. Gillis, Cape Breton
Joshua H. Livingstone, Cumberland
David McPherson, Halifax
Moses H. Nickerson, Shelburne
James O'Brien, Hants
Elisha B. Paul, Cumberland
William Whitman, Guysborough

Nominated candidates
1911 Nova Scotia Provincial Election

Legend
bold denotes party leader
† denotes an incumbent who is not running for re-election or was defeated in nomination contest

Valley

|-
| rowspan="2"|Annapolis
||
|Orlando Daniels2,09226.74%
|
|A. L. Davison1,93124.68%	
|
|
|
|
||
|Orlando Daniels
|-	
|
|J. R. Hall1,86323.81%	
||
|Norman Phinney1,93824.77%
|
|
|
|
||
|Joseph A. Bancroft†
|-
| rowspan="2"|Digby
||
|Joseph William Comeau1,89228.09%	
|
|Harry Hatheway Marshall1,59923.74%	
|
|
|
|
||
|Joseph William Comeau
|-
||
|Allen Ellsworth Wall1,85527.54%	
|
|F. P. Deveau1,38920.62%	
|
|
|
|
||
|Allen Ellsworth Wall
|-
| rowspan="2"|Hants
||
|James William Reid2,06625.24%
|
|P. M. Feilding2,00624.51%
|
|
|
|
||
|James O'Brien†
|-	
|
|George Wilson1,80922.10%
||
|Albert Parsons2,30328.14%	
|
|
|
|
||
|Albert Parsons
|-
| rowspan="2"|Kings
||
|Harry H. Wickwire2,41327.12%	
|
|S. C. Parker1,59917.97%		
|
|
|
|N. W. Eaton1,89321.28% (Moral Reform)
||
|Harry H. Wickwire
|-
||
|Archibald Menzies Covert2,15624.24%	
|
|
|
|
|
|Charles Alexander Campbell8359.39% (Moral Reform)
||
|Charles Alexander Campbell
|}

South Shore

|-
| rowspan="2"|Lunenburg
||
|Alexander Kenneth Maclean3,13627.98%
|
|Alfred Clairmonte Zwicker2,40521.46%
|
|
|
|
||
|Alexander Kenneth Maclean
|-	
|
|Charles Uniacke Mader2,67923.90%	
||
|Joseph Willis Margeson2,98726.65%	
|
|
|
|
||
|Charles Uniacke Mader
|-
| rowspan="2"|Queens
||
|Jordan W. Smith1,04726.42%
|
|Philson Kempton95324.05%
|
|
|
|
||
|Charles F. Cooper†
|-	
|
|W. P. Purney88422.31%	
||
|William Lorimer Hall1,07927.23%	
|
|
|
|
||
|William Lorimer Hall
|-
| rowspan="2"|Shelburne
||
|Robert Irwin1,24526.64%	
|
|R. Ward Fisher1,12023.97%	
|
|
|
|
||
|Robert Irwin
|-
||
|Smith Nickerson1,20225.72%	
|
|George Phillips1,10623.67%	
|
|
|
|
||
|Moses H. Nickerson†
|-
| rowspan="2"|Yarmouth
||
|Ernest Howard Armstrong1,66528.02%
|
|James G. d'Entremont1,18019.86%
|
|
|
|
||
|Ernest Howard Armstrong
|-	
|
|Henry S. LeBlanc1,51425.48%	
||
|Howard Corning1,58326.64%
|
|
|
|
||
|Henry S. LeBlanc
|-
|}

Fundy-Northeast

|-
| rowspan="2"|Colchester	
|
|William Davison Hill2,44925.07%
||
|Frank Stanfield2,59226.53%	
|
|
|
|
||
|William Davison Hill
|-	
|
|Benjamin Franklin Pearson2,20622.58%
||
|Robert H. Kennedy2,52225.82%	
|
|
|
|
||
|Benjamin Franklin Pearson
|-
| rowspan="2"|Cumberland
||
|James Ralston4,16826.10%	
|
|J. Flemming Gilroy4,03025.24%	
|
|
|
|
||
|Elisha B. Paul†
|-
||
|Rufus Carter4,15426.01%	
|
|C. R. Smith3,61722.65%	
|
|
|
|
||
|Joshua H. Livingstone†
|-
|}

Halifax

|-
|rowspan="3"|Halifax
||
|F. J. Logan6,14217.74%	
|
|Frederick P. Bligh5,18714.98%
|
|John T. Joy2,5757.44%
|
|
||
|David McPherson†
|-
||
|George Everett Faulkner6,12017.68%	
|
|Nelson R. Smith4,82513.94%	
|
|
|
|
||
|George Everett Faulkner
|-
||
|Robert Emmett Finn5,83616.86%	
|
|J. C. O'Mullin3,93711.37%	
|
|
|
|
||
|Robert Emmett Finn
|-
|}

Central Nova

|-
| rowspan="2"|Antigonish
||
|Fred Robert Trotter1,26727.24%
|
|Hugh MacDougall1,01621.84%
|
|
|
|
||
|Fred Robert Trotter
|-	
|
|Christopher P. Chisholm1,07023.00%	
||
|Edward Lavin Girroir1,29927.92%	
|
|
|
|
||
|Christopher P. Chisholm
|-
| rowspan="2"|Guysborough
||
|James Cranswick Tory1,86026.97%	
|
|G. T. MacNeil1,62523.56%	
|
|
|
|
||
|William Whitman†
|-
||
|James F. Ellis1,79426.01%	
|
|J. S. Wells1,61823.46%	
|
|
|
|
||
|James F. Ellis
|-
| rowspan="3"|Pictou
||
|Robert M. McGregor3,92917.39%
||
|Charles Elliott Tanner3,78816.76%	
|
|P. P. Foxgrove8353.70%
|
|
||
|Robert M. McGregor
|-
||
|Robert Hugh MacKay3,72516.49%	
|
|S. G. Robertson3,42815.17%	
|
|
|
|
||
|Robert Hugh MacKay
|-	
|
|Archibald MacKenzie3,29914.60%	
|
|John M. Baillie3,59115.89%	
|
|
|
|
||
|John M. Baillie
|-
|}

Cape Breton

|-
| rowspan="2"|Cape Breton	
|
|Arthur Samuel Kendall5,98723.99%
||
|John Carey Douglas6,25225.05%	
|
|
|
|
||
|Arthur Samuel Kendall
|-	
|
|W. F. Carroll5,75623.07%
||
|Robert Hamilton Butts6,24625.03%	
|
|
|
|Alex McKinnon7132.86% (Socialist)
||
|Neil J. Gillis†
|-
| rowspan="2"|Inverness
||
|Donald MacLennan2,72327.92%	
|
|C.E MacMillan2,14321.97%	
|
|
|
|
||
|C.E. MacMillan
|-
||
|James MacDonald2,61326.79%	
|
|Thomas Gallant2,27423.32%
|
|
|
|
||
|James MacDonald
|-
| rowspan="2"|Richmond
||
|Simon Joyce1,10828.94%	
|
|Felix Landry82121.45%	
|
|
|
|
||
|Felix Landry
|-
||
|Charles P. Bissett1,09728.66%	
|
|James McVicar80220.95%	
|
|
|
|
||
|Charles P. Bissett
|-
| rowspan="2"|Victoria
||
|George Henry Murray1,24733.76%	
|
|John Lemuel Bethune69618.84%	
|
|
|
|
||
|George Henry Murray
|-
||
|Angus A. Buchanan1,12430.43%	
|
|Duncan McDonald62716.97%	
|
|
|
|
||
|Angus A. Buchanan
|-

|}

References

Further reading
 

1911
1911 elections in Canada
1911 in Nova Scotia
June 1911 events